The Great Detachment is the sixth album by Canadian indie rock band Wintersleep, released in 2016 on Dine Alone Records.

The album received its widest publicity for "Amerika", a single whose video painted a seemingly apocalyptic portrait of contemporary American life before cutting away to a clip from a campaign speech by Donald Trump, several months before the 2016 presidential election. The song was their biggest hit since "Weighty Ghost" in 2007, reaching #1 on Canada's alternative and rock charts.

The album was a shortlisted Juno Award finalist for Adult Alternative Album of the Year at the Juno Awards of 2017.

Track listing
 "Amerika" 	
 "Santa Fe" 	
 "Lifting Cure" 	
 "More Than" 	
 "Shadowless" 	
 "Metropolis" 	
 "Spirit" 	
 "Freak Out" 	
 "Love Lies" 	
 "Territory" 	
 "Who Are You"

References

2016 albums
Wintersleep albums
Dine Alone Records albums
Albums produced by Tony Doogan